Jackson Tchatchoua (born 23 June 2001) is a Cameroonian  footballer who plays for Charleroi. He also holds a Belgian passport.

Club career
He made his Belgian First Division A debut for Charleroi on 24 July 2021 in a game against Oostende. Tchatchoua scored his first goal for Charleroi on December 16, 2021 against KRC Genk.

In March 2023, Tchatchoua was selected to represent Cameroon under-23  for the first time.

Personal life
Born in Belgium, Tchatchoua is of Cameroonian descent.

References

External links
 

2001 births
Belgian people of Cameroonian descent
Living people
Cameroonian footballers
Belgian footballers
Association football forwards
R. Charleroi S.C. players
Belgian Pro League players